The Wives of Israel will be the fourth novel in the Women of Genesis series by Orson Scott Card. It has yet to be released.

Plot summary
The book will be a continuation of the previous novel in the Women of Genesis series Rachel and Leah. The book left off after Rachel had married Jacob, following the marriage of her sister Leah. Card states in the afterword of Rachel and Leah that he had not intended to have the story be continued in two more books, but that it would have been too much to include the marriage/concubinage of the sister's handmaidens and so decided to put them into consecutive books to cover that subject as well as the children and their raising and adventures (chiefly Joseph and his brothers, and Joseph's further adventures into slavery in Egypt, possibly from the point of his wife). Though Card says that he plans to leave the matter of Judah's daughter-in-law, Tamar, alone.

Expected release date
At this time, the expected release date is unknown.

See also

List of works by Orson Scott Card
Orson Scott Card

Novels based on the Bible
Novels by Orson Scott Card
Historical novels
Sequel novels
Upcoming books